Plicosepalus is a genus of hemiparasitic flowering plants belonging to the family Loranthaceae.

Members of the genus are native range to eastern, central and southern Africa, the Levant, and the Arabian Peninsula.

Species:

Plicosepalus acaciae 
Plicosepalus amplexicaulis 
Plicosepalus curviflorus 
Plicosepalus foliosus 
Plicosepalus kalachariensis 
Plicosepalus meridianus 
Plicosepalus ogadenensis 
Plicosepalus robustus 
Plicosepalus sagittifolius 
Plicosepalus somalensis 
Plicosepalus undulatus

References

Loranthaceae
Loranthaceae genera